Casual is an American television comedy-drama series that premiered on October 7, 2015, on Hulu. Created by Zander Lehmann and directed by Jason Reitman, it centers on Valerie (Michaela Watkins), a newly divorced single mother living with her brother Alex (Tommy Dewey) and her daughter Laura (Tara Lynne Barr). The cast also includes Frances Conroy and Nyasha Hatendi.

In advance of its premiere on Hulu, the first two episodes received a preview screening at the 2015 Toronto International Film Festival as part of the festival's new Primetime platform of selected television projects.

On October 19, 2017, Hulu renewed the series for a fourth and final season with all eight episodes released simultaneously on July 31, 2018.

Cast and characters

Main
 Michaela Watkins as Valerie, a successful therapist divorcing her husband after finding him with a younger woman.
 Tommy Dewey as Alex, Valerie's younger brother who co-founded the popular dating site Snooger
 Tara Lynne Barr as Laura, Valerie's teenage daughter
 Nyasha Hatendi as Leon, Valerie's one-night stand whom Alex befriends
 Julie Berman as Leia, Valerie's assistant

Guest and recurring
 Fred Melamed as Charles, Valerie and Alex's hedonistic father
 Evan Crooks as Emile, Laura's ex-boyfriend
 Alisha Boe as Becca, Laura's friend
 Taylor Spreitler as Mia, Laura's friend
 Frances Conroy as Dawn, Valerie and Alex's mother
 Patrick Heusinger as Michael, Laura's photography teacher
 Zak Orth as Drew, Valerie's ex-husband
 Eliza Coupe as Emmy, Alex's free-spirited romantic interest
 Katie Aselton as Jennifer, a therapist who works in the same building as Valerie.
 Dylan Gelula as Aubrey, a student in Laura's homeschool group.
 Britt Lower as Sarah Finn, Alex's ex-girlfriend.
 Vincent Kartheiser as Jordan Anderson, Alex's new partner in his company and Sarah's fiancé
 Britt Robertson as Fallon, Jordan's assistant.
 Kyle Bornheimer as Jack, Valerie's love interest, friend of Jennifer.
 Rhenzy Feliz as Spencer, Laura's classmate and boyfriend, who has terminal cancer.
 Jamie Chung as Tina Valerie's landlord who becomes involved with Alex
  Nadine Nicole as Casey, Laura's boss and an environmental activist 
  Maya Erskine as Rae, Alex's roommate and the mother of his daughter, Carrie. 
 Judy Greer as Judy, a single mom who also hires Alex to work in her company's IT department.
 Lorenza Izzo as Tathiana, Laura's girlfriend she met while traveling.

Episodes

Series overview

Season 1 (2015)

Season 2 (2016)

Season 3 (2017)
On June 23, 2016, Hulu renewed the series for a 13-episode third season. The season premiered on May 23, 2017.

Season 4 (2018)
On October 19, 2017, Hulu renewed the series for a fourth and final season with all 8 episodes being released simultaneously on July 31, 2018.

Reception
The first season received critical acclaim. On Metacritic the first season holds a rating of 77 out of 100 based on 20 critic reviews, indicating 'generally favorable reviews'. Rotten Tomatoes gave the first season a 93% 'certified fresh' rating based on 28 critic reviews, with the critical consensus "Jason Reitman's Casual is a funny -- albeit very specific -- look at modern dating, sharpened by edgy dialogue and self-assured performances." For the 73rd Golden Globe Awards, the series was nominated in the category for Best Television Series - Musical or Comedy.

The second season received similar acclaim. It holds an 87% approval rating on review aggregator website Rotten Tomatoes, based on 15 reviews, with an average rating of 8.8/10. The site's critical consensus reads, "Well-written and solidly acted, Casual offers a profane -- yet profound -- take on life's many challenges". On Metacritic, the season holds a rating of 88 out of 100, based on 7 critics, indicating "Universal acclaim". The third season also has a critics' rating of 88.

See also
List of original programs distributed by Hulu

References

External links

2015 American television series debuts
2018 American television series endings
2010s American comedy-drama television series
2010s American LGBT-related comedy television series
2010s American LGBT-related drama television series
Casual sex in television
English-language television shows
Hulu original programming
Lesbian-related television shows
Television series about dysfunctional families
Television series about siblings
Television series by Lionsgate Television
Television shows set in Los Angeles